Mukhalingam, also known as Srimukhalingam or Mukhalinga is a village panchayat in Jalumuru mandal of Srikakulam district in indian state of Andhra Pradesh, India. Mukhalingam is derived from an Odia word Moohalinga which is the corrupt form of "Madhukalinga" or "Mahulalinga", a linga formed by madhuka/Mahula in odia (Honey plant) tree.  Before 1936 it was under undivided Ganjam District. It was the erstwhile capital of the Eastern Ganga dynasty, and later the capital of Khemundi Gangas of Paralakhemundi Estate. It is home to a group of three Śiva temples - Madhukeswara, Someswara, Bhimeswara - which have been variously dated by historians from late eighth century to early eleventh century CE. The village is located on the left bank of Vamsadhara river at a distance of 31 km from Paralakhemundi town and 48 km from Srikakulam town. The main temple of Sri mukhalingam  was built by Eastern Ganga Dynasty King Kamaranava deva II, great grand father of Anantavarman Chodaganga Deva of Kalinga.Later in 17th century Maharaja of Paralakhemundi Estate Renovated this temple.

Geography

Transportation 

Srimukhalingam is well Connected by road ways. Andhrapradesh State Highway 106 passes through Srimukhalingam village.

The village is also very near to Paralakhemundi town , district Headquarter of Gajapati District of Odisha state. Auto , taxi, bus , cabs facilities are there from the town.

APSRTC operates Several buses from srikakulam  bus stand to Srimukhalingam village. Many of Autos , Taxis and cabs are also available from Challavanipeta village to Srimukhalingam village.

Andhrapradesh SH106 Connects Jarjangi, Challavanipeta, Jalumuru, Budithi , komanapalli and Pindruvada villages with Sri mukhalingam village.

Demographics
According to the 2011 Census of India, the demographic details of Mukhalingam are as follows:
 Total Population: 3,022 in 837 Households
 Male Population: 1,504 and Female Population: 1,518
 Children under six years of age: 265 (Boys - 139 and Girls - 126)
 Literacy rate: 63.58%

Culture 
The dating of the temples has been contested among historians. The temples have been variously dated from late eighth century to eleventh century CE. The earliest among them was constructed in the late eighth or early ninth century and the latest one dates to early eleventh century. Every year famous Chakratirtha Snana (holy bath) is taken by pilgrims. Lakhs of pilgrims visit from Odisha and Andhra Pradesh on the auspicious day to take the holy bath and take blessings of Lord Shiva. The tample's first daily avisheka happens on the name of present Eastern Ganga Dynasty ruler of Paralakhemundi Estate as Dharmakata of the temple.

Gallery

References

Villages in Srikakulam district
Hindu pilgrimage sites in India
Former capital cities in India
Uttarandhra